Suragina is a genus of flies in the family Athericidae.

Species
Suragina agramma (Bezzi, 1926)
Suragina bezzii (Curran, 1928)
Suragina bimaculata Yang, Dong & Zhang, 2016
Suragina bivittata (Bezzi, 1926)
Suragina brevis Yang, Dong & Zhang, 2016
Suragina brunetti Malloch, 1932
Suragina caerulescens (Brunetti, 1912)
Suragina calopa (Brunetti, 1909)
Suragina cincta (Brunetti, 1909)
Suragina concinna (Williston, 1901)
Suragina coomani (Séguy, 1946)
Suragina decorata Brunetti, 1927
Suragina dimidiatipennis (Brunetti, 1929)
Suragina disciclara (Speiser, 1914)
Suragina elegans Karsch, 1884
Suragina falsa Oldroyd, 1939
Suragina fascipennis (Bezzi, 1916)
Suragina flavifemur Yang, Dong & Zhang, 2016
Suragina flaviscutellum Yang & Nagatomi, 1991
Suragina fujianensis Yang, 2003
Suragina furcata (Meijere, 1911)
Suragina guangxiensis Yang & Nagatomi, 1991
Suragina illucens Walker, 1859
Suragina intermedia (Brunetti, 1909)
Suragina jinxiuensis Yang, Dong & Zhang, 2016
Suragina labiata (Bigot, 1887)
Suragina lanopyga (Brunetti, 1909)
Suragina latipennis (Bellardi, 1861)
Suragina limbata (Osten Sacken, 1882)
Suragina longipes (Bellardi, 1861)
Suragina lucens (Meijere, 1911)
Suragina metatarsalis (Brunetti, 1909)
Suragina milloti (Séguy, 1951)
Suragina monogramma (Bezzi, 1926)
Suragina nigripes Malloch, 1932
Suragina nigriscutellum Yang, Dong & Zhang, 2016
Suragina nigritarsis (Doleschall, 1858)
Suragina nigromaculata (Brunetti, 1929)
Suragina pacaraima Rafael & Henriques, 1991
Suragina pauliani Stuckenberg, 1965
Suragina s-fuscum (Frey, 1954)
Suragina satsumana (Matsumura, 1916)
Suragina shii Yang, Dong & Zhang, 2016
Suragina signipennis Walker, 1861
Suragina sinensis Yang & Nagatomi, 1991
Suragina tricincta (Meijere, 1929)
Suragina uruma Nagatomi, 1985
Suragina varicolor (Brunetti, 1929)
Suragina yaeyamana Nagatomi, 1979
Suragina yaeyamana Nagatomi, 1979
Suragina yonganensis Yang, Dong & Zhang, 2016
Suragina yunnanensis Yang & Nagatomi, 1991

References

Athericidae
Brachycera genera
Taxa named by Francis Walker (entomologist)